Putka (Jauja Quechua for "muddy", also spelled Potga) is a mountain in the Andes of Peru which reaches a height of approximately . It is located in the Huánuco Region, Huamalíes Province, Puños District.

References 

Mountains of Peru
Mountains of Huánuco Region